Southgate Rugby League Football Club is a rugby league team based in Southgate College which is located in the London Borough of Enfield that usually competes in Veneto's Nines.

References

Sport in the London Borough of Enfield
Rugby league teams in London